The Conjuring Arts Research Center is a not-for-profit organization based in New York City dedicated to the preservation and interpretation of magic and its allied arts.

External links 
Conjuring Arts Research Center

Magic organizations